In the Baltic Sea region, groups of pirates of Slavic descent lived dating as far back as the 8th to 14th centuries.

Baltic Slavs, whose agriculture was not highly developed in early 800, were in dire need of resources since the dry islets were the only ones capable of cultivation and cattle were scarce.  Flax could be grown, and was turned into linen or canvas for cloth and used as a form of currency.  At this time the Baltic Slavs were also known for bee-keeping, trading their honey and wax to the Germans for use in church candles and in sealing documents.  Once trade began, the German form of currency circulated amongst the group.  After this point information on specifics of the trade between Germans and Slavs is unknown through the ninth century.

Attempt to control Wendish trade 
During this time period it is known that the Slavs crossed paths with the Danes, leading to a series of fateful events.  The Slavs of the Baltic had engaged in piratical activity before, while the Danes felt that trade and piracy went hand in hand, making for an interesting attempt at commercial relations.  Baltic Slavs soon became interested in expanding, attempting to get a hold of the rivers in Denmark in order to control the Wendish trade.  The Danes would not stand for this, causing war to arise between the two groups.  With the decline of Danish power after the death of their leader in 1035 fueling the Saxon Germans to fight for the possession of the rivers the Baltic Slavs were originally fighting for, the bloodshed raged on and it was not until the Wendish Crusade of 1147 that the Slavs were finally sent beyond the point of recovery, ending their 100-year campaign and therefore fixing German domination over the Baltic rivers and Wendish trade.

Denmark and Mecklenburg 
Between the years of 1375 through 1398, Queen Margaret of Denmark and the various dukes of Mecklenburg attempted to bring their countries together.  This attempt instigated piratical activity since the countries would not always agree with one another.  Both countries used the piracy that was present to their advantage, enabling the pirates to attack the opposing country.  Pirates took this use to their advantage also, encouraging them to pillage the targeted country without the worry of possible consequence.  Little did the queen and dukes know that once piracy was provoked, there was no easy way of stopping it.

Attacks on merchant ships 
During this time the merchants of the Hanseatic League (also known as the German Hansa) objected to the practice of using piracy, where fleets of pirate ships would attack and cause their trade to suffer irreparable losses from that point on.  On March 14, 1377 it was reported that 200 pirates were in the area, while a month later this number rose to 400.  After this time measures were taken as an attempt to reduce the amount of piracy, resorting to equipping peace ships and making them patrol the seas from the beginning of sailing season until November 11 of that year.  Trading vessels were also warned to not sail unless it was done in groups.

To prevent people from harboring a pirate it was made known that those who did harbor a pirate or any stolen good would be treated the same as the pirates themselves.  Duke Albert of Mecklenburg felt that he would not be accused of doing such a thing, seeing that he believed the pirates were supporters of his and would refrain from releasing his name.  The Duke was never caught while Queen Margaret was not so lucky, accused of frequently protecting and enabling the pirates.  In response to the accusations against Margaret, a truce was drawn to last from September 1381 through November 11, 1383, listing the names of pirate chiefs which included Danish nobles, knights, squires, bailiffs, councilors, and vassals of the queen.  These efforts proved to be useless and piracy continued, leaving the merchant Hansa to patrol the seas at a great risk.

Queen Margaret demands Skåne 
In 1384 Queen Margaret demanded that the province of Skåne be put under her control. The Hansa wrote a list of demands in return for the province, asking compensation for their great suffering at the hands of the pirates, but Queen Margaret made no commitments to these demands.  Upon meeting with the Hansa in 1385, she was informed of their refusal to surrender the province, so she took formal possession of the province against their will.  The Hansa were soon informed of this, but were unable to effectively object to her actions.  If they were to revolt the Hansa would be facing a war against Queen Margaret, and they were in no shape for such extreme actions.  With their cooperation, the queen had no need for her piratical partners, leading to the eventual end of piracy for that time.

War on Denmark 
The inevitable reappearance of pirates occurred in 1389 once Mecklenburg declared war upon Denmark, where the pirates were now fully under Mecklenburg’s control. It was made known that Mecklenburg would equip war ships and issue letters of marque to freebooters, placing the pirates under full legal protection. The pirates began to carry their stolen goods to Stockholm where they became known as Vitalienbrüder, which translates to “victual brothers”. After Stockholm they captured the islands Bornholm and Gotland as their headquarters due to the location. Here the pirates recognized that all members of a crew should be treated equally, dividing shares fairly, calling themselves Likendeeler or “equal dividers”. Despite being friend or foe of the Likendeeler, ships traveling through the Baltic were attacked where the crew was thrown overboard or murdered. Merchants in Strausland who claimed to have captured the pirates treated them in like manner, forcing the pirates into barrels with their heads sticking out at one end, storing them on deck as human cargo to be brought to the gallows. Piratical activity continued until the Hansa became an intermediate for Denmark and Mecklenburg where, this time, Queen Margaret had felt the effects of piracy. Her ships were captured and destroyed, Danish towns had been burnt to the ground, and a bishop on journey for her service was imprisoned in Stockholm.

Piracy outlawed 
By 1395 piracy was officially outlawed as an attempt to create peace in the Baltic once more, which ended up being more of a form of “paper peace”.  Piracy had proved to be so profitable that pirates continued their activity, using the island of Gotland as headquarters and Duke Eric of Mecklenburg as the pirate chief.  From there the pirates preyed on Russia and Livonia while continuing to raid the Hansa, then pressed on to assault the Grand Master of Prussia in 1398.  The Grand Master did not stand for this, equipping a large fleet and sailing to Gotland, where castles were burned and the pirates soon evacuated. King Albert of Sweden ceded Gotland to the Order as a pledge (similar to a fiefdom), with the understanding that they would eliminate the pirating Victual Brothers from this strategic island base in the Baltic Sea. An invasion force under Grand Master Konrad von Jungingen conquered the island in 1398 and drove the Victual Brothers out of Gotland and the Baltic Sea.

See also
Thalassocracy
 Narentines
Ushkuyniks
Victual Brothers
Kylfings

Footnotes

References 
Bjork, David K. "Piracy In The Baltic, 1375-1398." Speculum, 1943: 39-68.
Thompson, James Westfall. "Early Trade Relations Between the Germans and the Slavs." The Journal of Political Economy, 1922: 543-558.

Medieval Denmark
Jomsvikings
Piracy in the Baltic Sea
Medieval piracy
Slavic history
Hanseatic League
Viking warfare
History of the Baltic states